Van Buuren is a Dutch toponymic surname meaning "from/of Buuren". Buuren usually refers to the County or town of Buren in Gelderland, sometimes perhaps to Büren, Westphalia. Variant spellings are Van Beuren (an American form), Van Bueren, and Van Buren. Notable people with the surname include:

Van Buuren
Armin van Buuren (born 1976), Dutch DJ, record producer and remixer
David van Buuren (1886–1955), Dutch banker and art collector in Belgium
Graeme van Buuren (born 1990), South African cricketer
Kees van Buuren (born 1986), Dutch football defender
 (1884–1970), Dutch politician, Minister of Infrastructure 1937–39
Meindert van Buuren (born 1995), Dutch racing driver
Mitchell Van Buuren (born 1988), South African cricketer
Mosey van Buuren (1865–1950), South African rugby player
 (born 1962), Dutch football defender
Van Bueren
Edwin van Bueren (born 1980), Dutch football midfielder
Geraldine Van Bueren (born 1955), British international human rights lawyer
 (c.1380–1445), master builder of the Cologne Cathedral
Walter van Bueren (1912–?), Swiss boxer

See also
 Van Buren (surname), Dutch surname of the same origin and pronunciation
Armin von Büren (born 1928), Swiss cyclist
Oskar von Büren (born 1933), Swiss cyclist, brother of Armin
Otto von Büren (1822–1888), Swiss politician, mayor of Bern

References

Dutch-language surnames
Surnames of Dutch origin
Toponymic surnames